is a city  located in Niigata Prefecture, Japan. , the city had an estimated population of 31,374 in 12,408 households, and a population density of 70 people per km². Myōkō is a member of the World Health Organization’s Alliance for Healthy Cities  (AFHC).

Geography
Myōkō is located in an inland region of north-central Niigata Prefecture, on the border of Nagano Prefecture. It lies in mountain surroundings near the historical entrance to the Echigo Plains. The city is surrounded by five mountains. Mount Madarao, Mount Myōkō, Mount Kurohime, Mount Togakushi and Mount Iizuna are collectively known as the Five Mountains of Northern Shinshu (北信五岳, Hokushingogaku). They make up the border of Nagano and Niigata Prefectures. Most of the city is covered with mountains and forests. As the city name implies, Mount Myōkō is in the city, much of which is within the borders of the Myōkō-Togakushi Renzan National Park. In addition to its namesake, Mount Myōkō, the city is home to two other 100 Famous Japanese Mountains, Mount Hiuchi (2,462) and Mount Takatsuma (2,353m).

Surrounding municipalities
Niigata Prefecture
Jōetsu
Itoigawa
Nagano Prefecture
Nagano
Iiyama
Shinano
Otari

Climate
Myōkō has a Humid climate (Köppen Cfa) characterized by warm, wet summers and cold winters with heavy snowfall.

Demographics
Per Japanese census data, the population of Myōkō has declined steadily over the past 60 years.

History
The area of present-day Myōkō was part of ancient Echigo Province.  During the Edo period the area was divided between the holdings of Takada Domain and tenryō territory administered directly by the Tokugawa shogunate. With the creation of the modern municipalities system on June 26, 1890, the village of Arai was created within Nakakubiki District, Niigata. Arai was raised to town status on September 9, 1892 and to city status on November 1, 1954. The city of Myōkō was created on April 1, 2005, by the merger of the city of Arai with the town of  Myōkōkōgen, and the village of Myōkō (both from Nakakubiki District).

Economy
The economy of Myōkō is dependent on seasonal tourism, agriculture and forestry, and light manufacturing.

Government
Myōkō has a mayor-council form of government with a directly elected mayor and a unicameral city legislature of 18 members. Myōkō contributes one member to the Niigata Prefectural Assembly. In terms of national politics, the city is part of Niigata 6th district of the lower house of the Diet of Japan.

Education
Myōkō has nine public elementary schools and three public middle schools operated by the city government, and one public high school operated by the Niigata Prefectural Board of Education. The prefecture also operates one special education school for the handicapped.

Transportation

Railway
 – Hokuriku Shinkansen

 Echigo Tokimeki Railway - Myōkō Haneuma Line
  -  - <> -  - 
 Shinano Railway - Kita-Shinano Line

Highway
 Jōshin-etsu Expressway – Myōkō IC
 
 
Note: Jōetsumyōkō station is actually in Jōetsu, 1.5 km away from the border with Myōkō.

Local attractions
 Myōkōkōgen and the former village of Myōkō are famed for their ski resorts. The first of these, Akakura, was founded in the 1930s, making it one of the oldest established ski areas in the world. It is also a traditional mountain retreat of Japan's imperial family. The Myōkō Ski Area has nine main mountain resorts: Myōkō Akakura, Ikenotaira Onsen, Myōkō Suginohara (which boasts the longest ski run in Japan), Seki Onsen, Kyukamura, Myōkō Ski Park, Lotte Arai Resort, Madarao Kogen and Tangram Ski Circus.
 Myōkō Kōgen is also well known for its many local onsen (hot springs) emanating from the Jigoku-dani valley between Mts. Myōkō and Mae.
Kannondaira-Tenjindō Kofun Group is a Kofun period National Historic Site
Kanzuri, a traditional fermented condiment, is made in Myōkō.
Samegao Castle, ruins of a Sengoku period castle and National Historic Site
Hida Sites, Yayoi period archaeological site and National Historic Site

International relations

Twin towns — Sister cities
Myōkō is twinned with:
 Slovenj Gradec, Slovenia
 Zermatt, Switzerland

References

External links

Official Website 
Travel Website 

 
Cities in Niigata Prefecture